The Portuguese Heritage Society, also known as Lusitano, is a national not-for-profit organization based in Mineola, New York, founded in 1995.  Its members and volunteers support, spread, and enrich Portuguese culture for those living in the United States.  P.H.S. Lusitano is primarily active in Long Island, Newark, and other Portuguese-populated locales in the Tri-State area.

Objectives
For centuries the Portuguese people have been emigrating to various parts of the world, forming communities, and organizing social groups.  P.H.S. Lusitano has three primary objectives:
 provide a place where any Portuguese or Portuguese-descendant can socialize and interact with each other to preserve and spread their culture
 expand Portuguese culture within the membership ranks and the community by bringing comedians, singers, performers, and politicians from Portugal to perform or speak in the United States
 support Portuguese communities, donating resources to local Portuguese charities as well as those serving Portuguese communities abroad
A recent trend is the growing number of Portuguese emigrants and their descendants uniting and collaborating via online social networking services.

Charitable work
The P.H.S. Lusitano organizes fundraisers to donate annually to the local police and fire departments, volunteer ambulance corps, and various other community programs.  The group has also donated to causes in Barcelos, Chaves, Paredes de Coura, Vila Verde, and Timor. The P.H.S. Lusitano also raises funds for local Portuguese people with critical needs.

Other activities

Sports honors

Political speakers

Invited performers

External links
 P.H.S. Lusitano, official site
 Portuguese Social, a.k.a. LusoSphere.com, social networking site

Portuguese culture
1995 establishments in the United States
Ethnic fraternal orders in the United States
Diaspora organizations in the United States
Organizations established in 1995
Portuguese-American culture in New Jersey
Portuguese-American culture in New York (state)